Harmony is an unincorporated master-planned community near St. Cloud, Florida, United States. It is part of the Orlando–Kissimmee Metropolitan Statistical Area.

According to 2010 Census data, Harmony is home to more than 1,000 residents.

Harmony is a Green-certified community, certified by the Florida Green Building Coalition.

Development plans for Harmony were set in motion by 1996. The Harmony Community Development District was established by local ordinance in March 2000.

Harmony developed a cooperative relationship with the University of Florida's Department of Wildlife Ecology and Conservation in 2001. Harmony was demonstrating a real-life example of people living and working in the same community. The goal was to show that this could be done in a sustainable way while also minimizing the impact on the local ecology.

The Harmony Residential Owners Association (ROA) was created on October 8, 2002. It "establishes a mechanism by which to realize the goal of creating a community in which good citizenship and community service are encouraged from all residents". The owners association is responsible for maintenance as well as community-wide standards for all common areas of Harmony not managed by the CDD.

The Harmony ROA is noteworthy among home owners associations in that it established within its founding documents guidelines delineating the peaceful coexistence of humans and wild animals. "This document seeks to articulate a philosophy that allows natural elements to persist unimpeded by humans and minimizes the circumstances that lead to conflict between humans and wildlife." "In harmony with nature" has been a motto of the community since its inception.

Harmony was opened for occupancy in approximately 2003 and ownership was transferred to Starwood Capital Group in 2005.

References

External links
 Developer site
 HarmonyFLcommons.com - Residential Owners Association Documents

Unincorporated communities in Osceola County, Florida
Planned communities in Florida
Populated places established in 2003
Greater Orlando
Unincorporated communities in Florida
2003 establishments in Florida